KF Rinia 98 is a football club based in the village of Dolno Svilare, Saraj Municipality, North Macedonia. They are currently competing in the Macedonian Third League (North Division).

References

Rinia 98
Association football clubs established in 1998
Rinia 98